The 2018 Tre Valli Varesine was the 98th edition of the Tre Valli Varesine road cycling one day race. It was held on 9 October 2018 as part of the 2018 UCI Europe Tour in category 1.HC, over a distance of 203 km, starting in Saronno and ending in Varese.

Teams
Twenty-five teams were invited to take part in the race. These included thirteen UCI WorldTeams, eight UCI Professional Continental teams and four UCI Continental teams.

Results

References 

Tre Valli Varesine
Tre Valli Varesine
Tre Valli Varesine